Chandra-raja II (r. c. 836-863 CE ) was an Indian king from the Shakambhari Chahamana dynasty. He ruled parts of present-day Rajasthan in north-western India.

Chandra succeeded his father Govindaraja I (alias Guvaka I) on the Chahamana throne. The Bijolia inscription names Guvaka's successor as Shashi-nripa (IAST: Śaśinṛpa), which appears to be another name of Chandraraja II. Both the names - "Chandra-raja" and "Shashi-nripa" - literally mean "moon-king".

The Prithviraja Vijaya eulogizes Chandra using vague terms, but little concrete information is available about his reign. He was succeeded by his son Govindaraja II (alias Guvaka II).

References

Bibliography 

 
 

Chahamanas of Shakambhari
9th-century Indian monarchs